Hugo Francis Marcolini (April 7, 1923 – September 22, 1963) was an American football player who played at the back position on both offense and defense. He played college football for St. Bonaventure in 1946 and 1947 and professional football for the Brooklyn Dodgers in 1948.

Early years
Marcolini was born in 1923 in Brooklyn. He served in the United States Marine Corps during World War II.

College football and military service
Marcolini played college football for St. Bonaventure during its 1946 and 1947 seasons.

Professional football
He was selected by the Boston Yanks in the 16th round (137th overall pick) of the 1947 NFL Draft but did not play for the Yanks. He played professional football in the All-America Football Conference (AAFC) for the Brooklyn Dodgers during their 1948 season. He appeared in 10 or 11 games for the Dodgers.

Later years
After retiring as a player, Marcolini coached the football team at St. Cecilia High School in Englewood, New Jersey, from 1952 to 1957 and at Mahwah High School in Mahwah, New Jersey, from 1958 to 1963, compiling a record of 43-31-10. He died in 1963 of a heart attack at age 40.

References

1923 births
1963 deaths
Brooklyn Dodgers (AAFC) players
St. Bonaventure Brown Indians football players
Sportspeople from Brooklyn
Players of American football from New York City
United States Marine Corps personnel of World War II